The UFL "Premiere" Season Draft was the inaugural draft of the United Football League (UFL). The results of the draft were announced via press release on June 19, 2009.

Among the players selected were those that participated in earlier workouts in Orlando, Florida and Las Vegas, Nevada. Once drafted by a UFL team, a player's rights were held by that team if he agreed to play within the league.

Draft results

California Redwoods

Florida Tuskers

Las Vegas Locomotives

New York Sentinels

References

External links
Draft results press release

2009
Draft